Sharon Sayles Belton (born May 13, 1951) is an American community leader, politician and activist. She is Vice President of Community Relations and Government Affairs for Thomson Reuters Legal business.

She served as mayor of Minneapolis, Minnesota, from 1994 until 2001, the first African American and first woman to hold that position.

Early life and education
Sayles Belton was born in Saint Paul, Minnesota, as one of four daughters of Bill and Ethel Sayles. After her parents separated, she lived for one year with her mother in Richfield, Minnesota, where she was the only African American in East Junior High School, then moved to south Minneapolis to live with her father and stepmother. She attended Central High School in Minneapolis. She volunteered as a candy striper at Mount Sinai Hospital, and later worked as a nurse's aide. She was briefly a civil rights activist in the state of Mississippi.

Sayles Belton attended Macalester College in Saint Paul, where she studied biology and sociology. She later worked as a parole officer with victims of sexual assault. Like her grandfather Bill Sayles, she became a neighborhood activist.

Career
In 1983, Sayles Belton was elected by the Eighth Ward to the Minneapolis City Council. She was inspired by working with mayor Donald M. Fraser. She represented the state at the 1984 Democratic National Convention, where Minnesota politician Walter Mondale was nominated for President of the United States. A member of the Minnesota Democratic-Farmer-Labor Party, Sayles Belton was elected city council president in 1990.

In 1993, she announced her candidacy for mayor. With the help of three phone banks and a staff of ten, she was elected on a platform that included reform of the police department, the first African American and the first woman mayor in the city's 140-year history. She defeated DFL former Hennepin County Commissioner John Derus. She was reelected in 1997, defeating Republican candidate Barbara Carlson. Sayles Belton held the position for two terms, from January 1, 1994, to December 31, 2001.

The city also addressed archaic utilities billing, outdated water treatment and neighborhood flooding. By the end of the decade, Minneapolis had increased property values, the city had its first increase in population since the 1940s, and there was reversal of a "50-year economic slide." Fraser credits Sayles Belton with stabilizing neighborhoods amid racial tensions, supporting the school system, and being an able and savvy city manager. Critics opposed the use of city subsidies for downtown development, said to total $90 million combined for the Target store and Block E.

In the 2001, election Sayles Belton lost her party's endorsement and the Democratic primary to R. T. Rybak, who received the support of the powerful Minneapolis Police Federation. After leaving the mayor's office, Sayles Belton became a senior fellow at the Roy Wilkins Center for Human Relations and Social Justice. The center is part of the Hubert H. Humphrey Institute of Public Affairs.

Sayles Belton worked in community affairs and community involvement for the GMAC Residential Finance Corporation, headquartered in Minneapolis. In 2010, she joined Thomson Reuters as vice president of Community Relations and Government Affairs, based in Eagan, Minnesota.

Personal life 
She is married to Steven Belton, with whom she raised three children: Kilayna, Jordan, and Coleman.

Associations
Sayles Belton is involved in race equality, community and neighborhood development, public policy, women's, family and children's issues, police-community relations and youth development. In 1978 she co-founded the Harriet Tubman Shelter for Battered Women in Minneapolis. She is a co-founder of the National Coalition Against Sexual Assault. She contributed to the Neighborhood Revitalization Program, Clean Water Partnership, Children's Healthcare and Hospital, the American Bar Association, the Bush Foundation, the United States Conference of Mayors, the National League of Cities, and Hennepin County Medical Center by chairing or serving on their boards.

Awards and recognition
 Gertrude E. Rush Distinguished Service Award presented by the National Bar Association
 Rosa Parks Award, presented by the American Association for Affirmative Action
 A bust of Sayles Belton was unveiled in Minneapolis City Hall on May 16, 2017, which was declared Sharon Sayles Belton day in Minnesota by Governor Mark Dayton.

Notes

External links

1951 births
Living people
Politicians from Saint Paul, Minnesota
African-American mayors in Minnesota
African-American city council members in Minnesota
Minnesota Democrats
Mayors of Minneapolis
Minneapolis City Council members
American civil rights activists
American women's rights activists
Children's rights activists
Women mayors of places in Minnesota
Probation and parole officers
Women city councillors in Minnesota
Central High School (Minneapolis, Minnesota) alumni
Women civil rights activists
21st-century African-American people
21st-century African-American women
20th-century African-American people
20th-century African-American women
African-American women mayors